The Main Directorate of Intelligence of the Ministry of Defence of Ukraine (abbreviated as HUR MO or GUR) is the military intelligence service of the Ukrainian government. It is an agency of the Ministry of Defence, not the General Staff of the Armed Forces of Ukraine.

The agency's motto is "The Wise will rule the Stars". Up to 2016, it was "Statehood, professionalism, decency".

Spheres of activity 
The Main Directorate of Intelligence of the Ministry of Defence  of Ukraine conducts its activity in the military, political, technical, economic, signals, informational and environmental spheres.
 
The major missions: 
 Obtaining, analyzing and dissemination of the intelligence information to the senior civil and military authorities of Ukraine.
 Performing special tasks in order to promote the National interests and State policy of Ukraine in economic, political, military, technical, environmental and informational areas, contributing to the national defence, fostering the economic development, promoting science and technology, and protecting the State border.
 Participating in operations against terrorism, international organised crime, drug, arms and technologies trafficking, and illegal migration.
 Counteracting the external threats that can affect the National security of Ukraine, lives and health of its citizens and the state facilities abroad.

History 

The agency was established from the existing intelligence assets of the Kyiv, Odesa and Carpathian military districts of the Soviet Armed Forces and its Main Intelligence Directorate (GRU), following the dissolution of the Soviet Union and the independence of Ukraine.

The Intelligence Directorate of the General Headquarters of the Armed Forces of Ukraine was established in February 1992. Based on a presidential decree issued on September 7, 1992, the Strategic Military Intelligence Directorate of the Ministry of Defence was created. The existence of two separate agencies with similar responsibilities, and reporting to different authorities, hampered the development of an effective military intelligence system.

On July 6, 1993, the Decree of the President of Ukraine ordered the merging of the two agencies to form the Main Military Intelligence Directorate of the Ministry of Defence. It was renamed the Main Intelligence Directorate of the Ministry of Defense of Ukraine, or Defence Intelligence of Ukraine (DIU) for short, on April 4, 1994.

In 2016 President Petro Poroshenko changed the GUR emblem. It was now an owl holding a sword directed against Russia with the new motto "The wise will rule over the stars". Moscow was outraged by the new emblem.

On March 22, 2001, the Ukrainian parliament (Rada) ratified the Law of Ukraine “On Intelligence Agencies of Ukraine”. The HUR MOU was given the status of special government authority.

Organization 
The HUR has an executive office and several agency-wide functions, and five major directorates and departments consisting of the following:

Directorates:
 Strategic Intelligence Directorate
 Armed Forces General Staff Intelligence Support Directorate
 Information Support Directorate
 Personnel Policy Directorate
 Logistic Directorate

Departments:
 Internal Security Department
 Planning Department
 Automation and Communication Department
 Economic and Finance Department
 Information and state secret protection Department

Formations of the CDI-MDU 
The only field reconnaissance unit of the CDI is a special unit subordinated to the Directorate's 4th Special Intelligence Service (4-та Служба спеціальної розвідки):

 10th Separate Special Purpose Unit (10-й окремий загін спеціального призначення, Military Unit А2245), based in Rybalskyi Peninsula, Kyiv
 3 operational companies – 1st – 3rd Special Purpose Company (1 – 3 сотня спеціального призначення)

Formations reporting to the CDI but are operationally part of the Armed Forces and the National Guard include:

Armed Forces formations 

 10th Special Detachment
 49th Reconnaissance Battalion (Training)
 54th Reconnaissance Battalion
 74th Reconnaissance Battalion
 129th Reconnaissance Battalion
 140th Reconnaissance Battalion
 143rd Reconnaissance Battalion
 130th Reconnaissance Battalion
 131st Reconnaissance Battalion
 Ukrainian Foreign Legion

National Guard formations 
 Special Forces Anti-terrorism Detachment "Omega", Novi Petrivtsi
 Special Forces Detachment "Vega", Lviv
 Special Forces Intelligence Detachment "Ares", Kharkiv

Legal basis
HUR MOU is legally allowed to operate based upon the following laws:

 The Constitution of Ukraine
 Verkhovna Rada Regulation "On National Security Concept of Ukraine (state policy fundamentals)", 1997
 The Law of Ukraine "On Defence of Ukraine", 2000
 The Law of Ukraine "On The Armed Forces of Ukraine", 2000
 The Law of Ukraine "On the Intelligence agencies of Ukraine", 2001
 The Law of Ukraine "Separate legislative acts of Ukraine Amendments in light of the Law of Ukraine", "About the Intelligence agencies of Ukraine" passage
 Presidential Decree "On the Ministry of Defence and the General Staff of the Armed Forces of Ukraine Status"

Directors
Lieutenant General Oleksandr Skipalskyi (October 16, 1992 – June 9, 1997)
Born in Volyn Oblast 1945. Graduated from the KGB Higher School in 1975.
Colonel General Ihor Smeshko (June 9, 1997 – September 29, 2000)
Born in Cherkasy Oblast 1955. Graduated from PhD from the National Academy of Defence in 2000.
Colonel General Viktor Paliy (September 29, 2000 – March 13, 2003)
Born in Dnipropetrovsk Oblast 1949. Graduated from the Military Academy of General Staff of USSR Armed Forces in 1988.
Colonel (ret.) Oleksandr Halaka (March 13, 2003 – January 17, 2008)
Born in Kharkiv 1955. Graduated from the Military Academy of Ground Forces Air-Defence in 1987 and the Kyiv University in 2000.
Lieutenant General Viktor Hvozd (January 17, 2008 – August 17, 2010)
Born in Ternopil Oblast 1959. Graduated from the Frunze Military College (Kyiv, 1981), Lviv University (1997), Magistrate of Kyiv University of Law and Economics (2005), Military-Diplomatic Academy (2009).
Major General Serhiy Hmyza (August 17, 2010 – February 26, 2014)
Born in Odesa Oblast 1960. Graduated Military College in 1981, the Military-Diplomatic Academy in 1991, Ukrainian State University in 2008.
Major General Yuriy Pavlov (since March 3, 2014 – July 28, 2015)
Born in Lviv Oblast 1962.
Lieutenant General Valeriy Kondratyuk (July 28, 2015 – October 15, 2016)
Major General Vasyl Burba (since October 15, 2016 – August 5, 2020)
 Major General Kyrylo Budanov (since August 5, 2020)

Notable members
Maksym Shapoval

See also 
 Foreign Intelligence Service of Ukraine
 Security Service of Ukraine

References

External links 
 Defence Intelligence of Ukraine, gov.ua

Military intelligence agencies
Ministry of Defence (Ukraine)
Ukrainian intelligence agencies